Brocklesby is a village in Lincolnshire, England.

Brocklesby may also refer to:

Places
Brocklesby, New South Wales, a town in the Riverina region of south west New South Wales, Australia.

People
Richard Brocklesby (priest) (1636–1714), English non-abjuring priest
Richard Brocklesby (1722–1797), English physician
Hubert 'Bert' Brocklesby, one of the Richmond Sixteen

Other
1940 Brocklesby mid-air collision, occurred over Brocklesby, New South Wales, Australia
Brocklesby railway station, a station in Brocklesby, Lincolnshire
Brocklesby Stakes, a British horse race
HMS Brocklesby, several Royal Navy ships named HMS Brocklesby